Locust Point (also Pirate Cove) is a small, peninsular neighborhood in the south eastern portion of the New York City borough of the Bronx. It is bounded by Harding Avenue on the north, the Throgs Neck Bridge to the east, and Eastchester Bay. The neighborhood is part of Bronx Community District 10. The area contains single-family houses, populated  ethnically by Irish, German, and Italian families. A famous former resident of Locust Point is Michael Kay, the Yankees TV broadcaster on the YES Network and radio talk show host on 1050 ESPN radio. The Locust Point Yacht club occupies the outermost block before the bay.

Locust Point used to be an island called Locust Island, however, the waterway that separated it from mainland Bronx was filled in and built upon. After it was no longer an island, its name was changed. Part of the landfill was for the bridge's northern ramp and toll plaza. Before it was Locust Island, it was called Wrights Island because it was owned by Captain J.T. Wright.

References

External links
Locust Point Yacht Club (Facebook page)
Locust Point Yacht Club, Bronx (Sail Clubs)
Locust Point Yacht Club (Waterkeeper Swim Guide)

Neighborhoods in the Bronx
Populated coastal places in New York (state)
Throggs Neck, Bronx